Gloria Patricia Manon (December 28, 1939 – November 12, 2018) was an American actress who was active mostly on television from 1965.

Life and career
Manon appeared in such television series as Daniel Boone, Burke's Law, The Name of the Game, The Six Million Dollar Man, The Mod Squad, and Quincy M.E..

Her film credits included All the Loving Couples (1969), I Love My Wife (1970), Willy Wonka & the Chocolate Factory (1971, as Mrs Curtis) and The Woman Inside (1981). She returned to the screen in 2004 as The Contessa in the video game Sly 2: Band of Thieves.

Manon died on November 12, 2018, at the age of 78.

Filmography

Film

Television

Video games

References

External links

1939 births
2018 deaths
21st-century American women
Actresses from Detroit
American television actresses
American voice actresses